Maciej Pospieszyński (born 1981) – is a Polish glider aerobatic pilot and a powered aerobatic pilot.

References

Aerobatic pilots
Glider pilots
Living people
Polish aviators
1981 births